Polygon Wood is a forest located between Ypres and Zonnebeke, West Flanders, Belgium. It was the scene for several battles during the First World War and there are at least two cemeteries of the Commonwealth War Graves Commission in the immediate vicinity of the wood.

History
Polygon Wood, near the village of Zonnebeke, was the location of a number of battles during the First World War, beginning in late 1914. It took its name from its shape on maps of the area. The wood had been held by the Germans since April 1915 but was captured by the Australian 5th Division in the Battle of Polygon Wood, which took place in the period from September to October 1917. Abandoned during the German spring offensive in March–April 1918, the area was the scene of further fighting in September 1918 when it was seized by the 9th (Scottish) Division.

The Commonwealth War Graves Commission maintains two cemeteries in or next to Polygon Wood. The first is the Polygon Wood Cemetery, located on Lange Streve, which runs along the north-east side of Polygon Wood, while the second is Buttes New British Cemetery, which is in the wood itself along with a memorial to the Australian 5th Division, located on top of an old butte.

Gallery

Notes

References

External links

 Polygon Wood
 YouTube video of Polygon Wood

Military history of Canada
World War I memorials in Belgium
Battle of Passchendaele
Forests of Belgium
World War I sites in Belgium
Geography of West Flanders
Cemeteries and memorials in West Flanders